Vesna Đukić (born 1 January 1986 in Celje, SR Slovenia) is a  Slovenian judoka. She competed in the 57 kg event at the 2012 Summer Olympics and lost in the first round. She is of Bosnian Serb descent.

References

External links
 
 
 

1986 births
Living people
Slovenian female judoka
Judoka at the 2012 Summer Olympics
Olympic judoka of Slovenia
Sportspeople from Celje
Slovenian people of Serbian descent
21st-century Slovenian women